The following is a list of people executed by the U.S. state of Texas between 1950 and 1959. During this period 76 people were executed by electrocution at the Huntsville Unit in Texas.

Three electrocutions took place on September 5, 1951; though no intervening law to prohibit multiple executions on a single day was passed, since this date Texas has not executed more than two people in a single day.

Executions 1950–1959

See also
Capital punishment in Texas

References

External links
Death Row 1923-1973. Texas Department of Criminal Justice

1960
20th-century executions by Texas
1950s-related lists
1950s in Texas